Chkalovskaya metro station may refer to:
Chkalovskaya (Moscow Metro), a metro station of the Moscow Metro, Moscow, Russia
Chkalovskaya (Nizhny Novgorod Metro), a station of the Nizhny Novgorod Metro, Nizhny Novgorod, Russia
Chkalovskaya (Saint Petersburg Metro), a station of the Saint Petersburg Metro, Saint Petersburg, Russia
Chkalovskaya (Yekaterinburg Metro), a station of the Yekaterinburg Metro, Yekaterinburg, Russia

See also
Chkalovsky (disambiguation)